José Charles Soares Matos (born 2 July 1997), known as Charles, is a Brazilian footballer who plays as a central defender for Barbalha.

Club career
Born in Barbalha, Ceará, Charles was an Icasa youth graduate. After appearing with the first team in the Taça Fares Lopes, he made his professional debut on 29 November 2014 by starting in a 3–2 Série B home win against Boa Esporte, as his side was already relegated.

Charles became a regular starter during the 2015 season, being elected the best player in his position of the year's Campeonato Cearense. On 28 August, he signed with Grêmio until 2017, being initially assigned to the under-20 squad.

After failing to make his breakthrough, Charles moved to Botafogo-PB in 2017. After an unassuming spell with Rio Claro, he agreed to a three-year deal with Santos on 6 October of that year, being initially assigned to the B-team.

Career statistics

Honours
Icasa
Taça Fares Lopes: 2014

Botafogo-PB
Campeonato Paraibano: 2017

References

External links

1997 births
Living people
Sportspeople from Ceará
Brazilian footballers
Association football defenders
Campeonato Brasileiro Série B players
Campeonato Brasileiro Série C players
Associação Desportiva Recreativa e Cultural Icasa players
Botafogo Futebol Clube (PB) players
Rio Claro Futebol Clube players
Santos FC players
Guarani Esporte Clube (CE) players